Ferrara is a city in Italy.

Ferrara may also refer to:
Ferrara (surname)
Province of Ferrara, a province in Italy
Duchy of Ferrara, a historical state in Italy
23rd Infantry Division Ferrara, an Italian infantry division of World War II
Ferrara Fire Apparatus, an American manufacturer of emergency services equipment
Ferrara Bakery and Cafe, a New York City restaurant
Ferrara Candy Company, a Chicago-based candy company

See also

Ferrari (disambiguation)
Ferraro, a surname
Ferreira (disambiguation)